Harry Jürgensen (born 30 May 1942) is a Chilean lawyer who is member of the Chilean Constitutional Convention. He served as Intendant of Los Lagos Region.

On 4 July 2021, he was appointed by Chile Vamos as candidate for being the president of the Convention, elections that he lost against Elisa Loncón.

References

External links
 BCN Profile

Living people
1942 births
20th-century Chilean lawyers
Intendants of Los Lagos Region
Members of the Chilean Constitutional Convention
21st-century Chilean politicians
National Renewal (Chile) politicians
People from Osorno, Chile